Commander's Digest was a biweekly periodical published by the United States Department of Defense and the Office of Information for the Armed Forces from 1960 to June 1978. After printing ceased, it was replaced by Command Policy. Its purpose was to provide "official and professional information to commanders and key personnel on matters related to Defense policies, programs and interests," and to promote "better understanding and teamwork within the Department of Defense."

In June 1967, an annual subscription cost $2.50, or single issues could be purchased from the Government Printing Office for 5 cents.

References

Biweekly magazines published in the United States
Defunct magazines published in the United States
English-language magazines
Magazines established in 1960
Magazines disestablished in 1978
Mass media of the military of the United States
Military magazines published in the United States
1960 establishments in the United States
1978 disestablishments in the United States